Ganesh Balawant Nawathe, better known as Pandit Jitendra Abhisheki (21 September 1929 – 7 November 1998), was an Indian vocalist, composer and scholar of Indian classical, semi-classical, and devotional music. While he distinguished himself in Hindustani music, he is also credited for the revival of the Marathi musical theatre in the 1960s. Jitendra Abhisheki has been praised as being "among the stalwarts of Hindustani classical music who mastered other musical forms such as thumri, tappa, bhajan, and bhavgeet. His work in Marathi natyasangeet is well-known."

An annual Pandit Jitendra Abhisheki Mahotsav is held, and the last was held in mid-October 2018 at the Yashwantrao Chavan Natyagruha in Kothrud, Maharashtra.  In Goa, a Pandit Jitendra Abhisheki Music Festival held at the local Kala Academy also reached its 14th edition in 2018.

Early life and background
Jitendra was born in priestly Padye Karhade Brahmin family in Mangeshi, Goa. His family was traditionally attached to the Mangeshi Temple of Lord Shiva. His father, Balawantrao aka Bikambhat, was a half-brother and a disciple of Deenanath Mangeshkar and the temple priest and a Kirtankar (performer of Kirtana, a devotional music style). Balawantrao taught Jitendra the basic principles of Hindustani classical music. Jitendra received further training in vocal music from Jagannathbua Purohit of Agra Gharana, Azmat Hussain Khan of Khurja Gharana, and Gullubhai Jasdanwala of Jaipur Gharana. Abhisheki was also well known for his renditions of his Marathi Natya Sangeet compositions like "Guntatá Hrdáya Hai", "He Suránno Chandra Vhá" and other songs/Marathi ghazals  such as "Májhe Jívana Gáne", "Kaivalyáchya", "Sarvátmaka sarveshvara", "Kátá rute kunálá" etc.

Career
After receiving a degree in Sanskrit literature, he joined All India Radio (AIR) at Mumbai for a brief period, when he came in contact with several musicians and also got an opportunity to display his musical talents by composing several pieces for radio programs. Around this time, he received a scholarship from the Indian Government for advanced training in Hindustani classical music under Azmat Hussain Khan.

He composed the padas (songs performed live during play) for the Katyar Kaljat Ghusali play.

He composed vocal as well as background scores for 25 Marathi plays. After receiving a Homi Bhabha fellowship in the late sixties, he taught at a music school run in the USA by sitarist Ravi Shankar. He maintained his ties to his homeland of Goa through his association with the Kala Academy, counseling and guiding students from that state.

Death
Abhisheki died on November 7, 1998 in Pune, after a prolonged illness related to diabetes that he was previously hospitalized for.

Legacy
The Pt. Jitendra Abhisheki Sangeet Mahotsav is held annually in Goa.

Students
Besides son Shounak Abhisheki, Abhisheki's well-known musical disciples include Asha Khadilkar, Devaki Pandit, Shubha Mudgal, Mohankumar Darekar, Hemant Pendse, Ajit Kadkade, Raja Kale, Prabhakar Karekar, Vijay Koparkar, Sameer Dublay, Dr. Hrishikesh Majumdar, Dr Mrs Madhuri Joshi, Mahesh Kale

Awards and recognitions
Homi Bhabha Fellowship (1969)
Natyadarpan Award (1978)
Padma Shri (1988)
Sangeet Natak Akademi Award (1989)
Maharashtra Gaurav Puraskar (1990)
Gomantak Marathi Academy Award (1992)
Balgandharva Award (1995)
Surashree Kesarbai Kerkar Award (1996)
Master Deenanath Smriti Award (1996)
Lata Mangeshkar Award (1996)
Balgandharva Award (Natyaparishad, 1997)
Saraswati Award (Kailas Math Nasik, 1997)

References

External links
Official site
Jitendra Abhisheki in the Vijaya Parrikar Library: Musical Traditions of India
Pandit Jitendra Abhisheki, Mahesh Kale's website
On Surgyan.com 
Pandit Jitendra Abhisheki on Saregama.com (music)

Konkani-language singers
1929 births
1998 deaths
Hindustani singers
Konkani people
People from North Goa district
Recipients of the Padma Shri in arts
Recipients of the Sangeet Natak Akademi Award
Marathi-language singers
20th-century Indian male classical singers
Singers from Goa
Bandish  composers